Thryptomene stenophylla is a shrub species in the family Myrtaceae that is endemic to Western Australia.

It blooms between June and August producing pink-purple flowers.

It is found on sand plains and hills in the Mid West region of Western Australia between Geraldton and Northampton where it grows in sandy to loamy soils over limestone.

References

stenophylla
Endemic flora of Western Australia
Rosids of Western Australia
Vulnerable flora of Australia
Plants described in 1904
Taxa named by Ernst Pritzel